Jing'an Temple is an esoteric Tangmi Buddhist temple on the West Nanjing Road in Shanghai.  Jing'an District, where it is located, is named after the temple.

History

The original temple was first built in 247 AD in the Wu Kingdom during the Three Kingdoms period of ancient China. Originally located beside the Suzhou Creek, it was relocated to the Jing'an site in 1216 during the Song dynasty. The temple was rebuilt in the Qing dynasty but, during the Cultural Revolution, the temple was razed and turned into a plastic factory. In 1983, the site was returned to its original purpose and the temple rebuilt. Over the years, the temple has been expanded, with the Jing'an Pagoda being completed in 2010. In 1953, Master Chisong (释持松), a monk who had been initiated into the Shingon sect and was trained as an acharya, was appointed abbot of the temple. He re-established the temple under the Tangmi Buddhist tradition and enshrined the Mandala of the Two Realms within the temple. In contemporary times, the temple still officially practices Tangmi Buddhism. On December 19, 2009, a 15-ton silver statue of Buddha Rudra cast in pure silver was installed in Jing'an Temple. More than ten 3-ton silver statues of the Bodhisattva and the disciples were added to the Daxiongbao Hall.

Features

Three Southern-style halls, each with its own courtyard, dating from the most recent reconstruction (1880):
 Hall of Heavenly Kings
 Hall of the Three Saints
 Hall of Virtuous Works
 The Mahavira Hall ("Precious Hall of the Great Hero"), the main hall
 To the east of the main hall is the Guanyin Hall. In the center of the hall is a statue of the goddess made out of camphor wood. Standing on a lotus-shaped base, it is 6.2 meters tall and weighs 5 metric tons
 Opposite the hall is the Jade Buddha Hall, where a 3.8-meter jade Buddha sits in the center. It is the largest sitting jade Buddha statue in the country
 Abbot's Chambers
 Ming Dynasty copper bell (Hongwu Bell), weighing 3.5 tons
 Stone Buddhas from the Southern and Northern Dynasties period (420-589 AD)
 Paintings by master painters, Chu Zhishan, Zhang Daqian and Wen Zhenming
Mandalas enshrined at a tantric altar on the upper floor

Transportation
The temple sits on top of the Jing'an Temple Station, a major hub of the Shanghai Metro network where Line 2 and Line 7 intersect.

You can take Bus No.113, 40, 830, 824, 20, 15, 37, 21 to arrive Jing'an Temple.

There are also Shuttle Express Service provided from airports to Jing'an Temple. Pudong Airport Shuttle Bus Line No. 2 run from City Terminal (beside Jing'an Temple)

Opening Time
The temple opens at 7:30AM and closes at 17:00PM daily in most times of the year .

References

External links
 
 Official Jing'an Temple website—
 Chinadaily.com.cn: Article on Jing'an Temple—
Travel China Guide on Jing An Temple-

Buddhist temples in Shanghai
Jing'an District
Qing dynasty architecture
Song dynasty architecture
3rd-century Buddhist temples
247 establishments
3rd-century establishments in China
Landmarks in Shanghai